The Politics of Aosta Valley, Italy since 1946 has taken place in a framework of a parliamentary representative democracy, whereby the president of Aosta Valley has been the head of government, and of a pluriform multi-party system. The regional government has exercised legislative power,  vested in both the government and the Regional Council of Aosta Valley.

Executive branch
The regional government executive power has been presided by the president of the region and has been  composed by the president and the assessors, who are currently 7.

List of presidents

Legislative branch

The Regional Council of Aosta Valley is composed of 35 members. The council is elected for a five-year term. His president since October 2020 is Alberto Bertin, Democratic Party.

Political parties and elections

Latest regional election

Latest general election in Aosta Valley

Notes

References

Sources
Regional Council of Aosta Valley – History of Aosta Valley
Regional Government of Aosta Valley – Governments since 1946
Regional Government of Aosta Valley – Elections
Cattaneo Institute – Archive of Election Data
Parties and Elections in Europe – Aosta Valley
Ministry of the Interior – Historical Archive of Elections

External links
Aosta Valley Region
Regional Council of Aosta Valley
Constitution of Aosta Valley

 
Aosta Valley